AWQAF Africa Muslim Open College is an institution of AWQAF Africa's educational department.  It was launched in 2005 to cater for educational needs of the Africans (including the North Africans) and for people of African origin (e.g. the Caribbeans).

Establishment
The Muslim Open College was founded while studying postgraduate degrees in Damascus early 1990s by founder of Awqaf Africa Sheikh Abu-Abdullah Adelabu (PhD Damas), a West African Muslim scholar and cleric of Nigerian origin who is the international organization's first al Amir (president). He also lectures and supervises on dissertations and publications of his students and followers, including the African Muslim Portals such as EsinIslam.Com, Muxlima.com, and IslamAfrica.Com.  Day-to-day activities and management of the College, its lectures, seminals, and administration are run mainly by volunteers and associates of Awqaf Africa in London, United Kingdom, Damascus, Syria, Lagos, Nigeria and Cape Town, South Africa.

Objectives
Like its umbrella organization Awqaf Africa, the Muslim Open College is an international organization which is incorporated in its structure with African Hajj and 'Umrah Commission and the African Union Muslim working to relieve human suffering amongst the Muslims of Africa - in particular and as a primary objective - and around the world - as necessary.  It shares the same aims and objectives as Awqaf Africa, especially for Muslim societies where each national society effectuates programmes of Awqaf Africa. Relief, human dignity, and spiritual uplift remain main goals of the international body.

Through education, Awqaf Africa's Open College seeks the causes of suffering, poverty, and Islamophobia and tries to eliminate them under the banner of Islamic teachings.

Studies
The Open College is also projected to provide, in particular, the African Muslims with studies and qualifications that enable them to serve themselves and their Muslim communities, offering them maximum flexibility, so that they can build a program of studies that fits both their personal and community needs and adapt accordingly. Awqaf Africa gives priority to those who serve or intend to serve the Muslim communities through teachings and preachings or administration and career development.

Studies at Awqaf Africa Muslim Open College are free, especially for the Africans (including the North Africans) and for people of African Origins (e.g. the Caribbeans) in an effort to help people develop their spiritual uplifts, to become a teacher, to foster their career development for the Muslims, or to serve as a Da^'i, offering them a true learning experience, supporting them as they study their first course with Awqaf Africa and appealing they intend to serve the Muslims and their interests - appreciating that a prospect of studying with Awqaf Africa could be so exciting that students overlook the sacred needs to be devoted to the amiable values of Islam.

The college coordinates a number of educational and training programmes for several Muslim portals including EsinIslam.com and IslamAfrica.com.

Qualifications and departments
 Certificate.
(for the beginners with no or less awareness and/or no previous courses in Islamic Studies) in
 Jurisprudence & Theology
 Literature & Theology
 History & Jurisprudence

 Ordinary Diploma (OD).
(for the intermediaries with good awareness and/or previous short or light courses in Islamic Studies) in
Jurisprudence & Theology
Literature & Theology
History & Jurisprudence
Sociology & Theology

 Advanced Diploma (AD).
(for the well-informed with better awareness or previous qualifications in Islamic Studies) in
Jurisprudence & Theology
Literature & Theology
History & Jurisprudence
Sociology & Theology
Finance & Jurisprudence

Higher Diploma (HD).
(for the well established and specialized "Students of Islamic Knowledge" or/and recognized Du'a^t with good knowledge in Islamic Studies) in
Jurisprudence & Theology
Literature & Theology
History & Jurisprudence
Sociology & Theology
Finance & Jurisprudence

Studies towards each award as above take a minimum of two years with each academic year lasting nine months, opening two weeks after (the pilgrimage or) 'I^d ul kabi^r and closing a week before (the fasting month of) Ramadan.

References

Educational institutions established in 2005
Religion in Africa
2005 establishments in Africa